Enrico Guazzoni (18 December 1876 – 23 September 1949) was an Italian screenwriter and film director. Guazzoni was the uncle of Jolanda Kodra, an Italian-Albanian writer and translator.

Selected filmography

 Brutus (1911)
 Agrippina (1911)
 Quo Vadis (1913)
 Antony and Cleopatra (1913)
 Julius Caesar (1914)
 Madame Guillotine (1916)
 Fabiola (1918)
 The Crusaders (1918)
 The Sack of Rome (1920)
 Messalina (1924)
 Miryam (1929)
 The Gift of the Morning (1932)
 Lady of Paradise (1934)
 The Joker King (1935)
 King of Diamonds (1936)
 The Two Sergeants (1936)
 I've Lost My Husband! (1937)
 Doctor Antonio (1937)
 Antonio Meucci (1940)
 The Daughter of the Green Pirate (1940)
 Pirates of Malaya (1941)
 La Fornarina (1944)

Bibliography
 Sorlin, Pierre. Italian National Cinema 1896-1996. Routledge, 1996.
 Vacche, Angela Dalle. Diva: Defiance and Passion in Early Italian Cinema. University of Texas Press, 2008.

References

External links

1876 births
20th-century Italian screenwriters
Italian male screenwriters
Italian film directors
Writers from Rome
1949 deaths
20th-century Italian male writers